Moïse Zongo (born 10 March 1996) is a Burkinabé international footballer who plays for Al-Thoqbah as a striker.

Career
Born in Abidjan, Ivory Coast, he has played club football for CF Mounana, Academie de Foot Amadou Diallo and Salitas.

He made his international debut for Burkina Faso in 2018.

On 7 January 2019, Najran has signed  Zongo for one seasons from Salitas.

On 31 January 2020, Al-Jubail has signed Zongo for one seasons.

On 29 December 2019, Al-Thoqbah has signed Zongo for one seasons.

References

1996 births
Living people
Citizens of Burkina Faso through descent
Burkinabé footballers
Burkina Faso international footballers
Ivorian footballers
Footballers from Abidjan
Ivorian people of Burkinabé descent
Sportspeople of Burkinabé descent
CF Mounana players
Academie de Foot Amadou Diallo players
Salitas FC players
Najran SC players
Al-Thoqbah Club players
Al-Jubail Club players
Saudi First Division League players
Saudi Second Division players
Association football forwards
Burkinabé expatriate footballers
Burkinabé expatriate sportspeople in Gabon
Expatriate footballers in Gabon
Expatriate footballers in Saudi Arabia
Burkinabé expatriate sportspeople in Saudi Arabia
Ivorian expatriate footballers
Ivorian expatriate sportspeople in Gabon
Ivorian expatriate sportspeople in Saudi Arabia
21st-century Burkinabé people
Burkina Faso A' international footballers
2018 African Nations Championship players